The Ludwig Börne Prize is a literary award that is awarded annually by the Frankfurt-based Ludwig-Börne-Stiftung. It is one of the most important of its kind in German-speaking countries.

Objective and methods 
In 1992 the banker and publicist Michael A. Gotthelf established a foundation that annually awards the Ludwig-Börne-Preis to a German-speaking author, acknowledging his or her outstanding performances in the fields of essays, reviews and reportage. Thus, the foundation celebrates the memory of the Frankfurt author, revolutionary democrat and political journalist Ludwig Börne (1786–1837) and his works.

A judge is nominated by the foundation board, for the sole responsibility of deciding who will win this award. This judge, moreover, makes a speech in the winner’s honor. The prize is worth 20,000 euros and its presentation takes place in St. Paul's Church in Frankfurt.

In 2010 the foundation for the first time awarded a Börne Honorary Medal to Marcel Reich-Ranicki for his lifetimes achievements.

Foundation board 
Founder and chairman of Ludwig-Börne-Stiftung is Michael A. Gotthelf. The foundation board is made up of Salomon Korn (chairman of the Jewish community in Frankfurt), Peter Feldmann (mayor of Frankfurt), Ina Hartwig (head of the Frankfurt culture department), Hubert Burda (Hubert Burda Media) and Thomas Bellut (ZDF director general),.

Award winners 

1993: Joachim Kaiser, editor
1994: Marie-Luise Scherer, author
1995: Marcel Reich-Ranicki, publicist and literary critic
1996: Joachim C. Fest, publicist, author and contemporary historian
1997: , philosopher and Protestant theologian
1998: Josef Joffe, publicist, publisher and lecturer
1999: Georges-Arthur Goldschmidt, author and translator
2000: no award
2001: Rudolf Augstein, journalist, publisher and publicist
2002: Hans Magnus Enzensberger, poet, author and editor
2003: George Steiner, author, philosopher and cultural critic
2004: Daniela Dahn, journalist and author
2005: , editor
2006: , journalist and author
2007: Henryk M. Broder, journalist and author
2008: Alice Schwarzer, women’s rights’ activist and publisher
2009: Frank Schirrmacher, journalist, publisher and author
2010: Marcel Reich-Ranicki (medal for his life work)
2011: Joachim Gauck, President of Germany, civil rights activist and publicist
2012: Götz Aly, historian and journalist
2013: Peter Sloterdijk, philosopher and essayist
2014: Florian Illies, journalist and author
2015: Jürgen Kaube, journalist and publisher
2016: , journalist
2017: Rüdiger Safranski, philosopher
2018: Souad Mekhennet, journalist
2019: Eva Menasse, writer
2020: Christoph Ransmayr, writer
2022: , journalist

References

Literature 
 : Essay – BRD. Vorwerk 8, Berlin 2011, pp. 120–122.

External links 

 

German literary awards
1992 establishments in Germany
Awards established in 1992
Culture in Frankfurt
Literary awards of Hesse